B-Tribe, or The Barcelona Tribe of Soulsters, is a musical project of the German-born musicians and producers Claus Zundel, Markus Staab and Ralf Hamm ("The Brave"), who are also known for their Sacred Spirit project. Driven by the use of classical Spanish guitar and other elements of flamenco music, in particular, using a direct mix from a prerecorded CD simply entitled Morente-Sabicas "Nueva York-Granada by world renown musicians; vocalist, Enrique Morente accompanied on guitar by Sabicas...  mixed with trip hop-like ambient tunes. All the albums were recorded in Zundels's own studio on Ibiza, Spain. Spanish musician Paco Fernandez plays guitars and cello parts are performed by Frankfurt Radio Orchestra member Eric Plummetaz. Singer Deborah Blando has also collaborated.

Career
B-Tribe first hit the music scene in 1993 with ¡Fiesta Fatal!, the single of that title "¡Fiesta Fatal!" becoming a #1 dance hit in Europe. It peaked at #64 in the UK Singles Chart in October 1993. B-Tribe was born into a niche (coming out that same year was Enigma's The Cross of Changes, while Deep Forest's self-titled album had come out in late 1993). "¡Fiesta Fatal!" and "Suave Suave" (which was released in 1995) became part of a less commercial side of the so-called World music scene that was growing in popularity in the United States during the mid-1990s. The Brave released the third B-Tribe album Sensual Sensual. Their popularity would be evidenced in 1997, arguably the peak of the genre's popularity, with the release of the first Pure Moods album. B-Tribe did not make the cut for Pure Moods the album, but the rendition of "She Moved Through the Fair" from 2001's ¡Spiritual, Spiritual! was featured on the compilation Pure Moods IV.

The album ¡Spiritual, Spiritual! is the most ambient album by the project. Only a handful of tracks feature a distinct drumbeat and the cello features in only one song on the album. B-Tribe's next album was the aptly titled 5 in 2003; it features songwriting and vocal contributions by African supermodel Luna Mohamed. The sixth B-Tribe album was released twice – as a limited release in 2007 on Macao Cafe, and a re-release on Holophon in December 2008.

Discography
 ¡Fiesta Fatal! (1993)
 Suave Suave (1995)
 Sensual Sensual (1998)
 ¡Spiritual, Spiritual! (2001)
 5 (2003)
 Volume 6 (2008)

Fiesta Fatal (1993) 
Intro: Sueno Del Cielo 	
¡Fiesta Fatal! (Album Edit) (Theme from Belfast Child) 	
Nadie Entiende 	
Lo Siento 	
Una Vez Mas 	
Love, Tears, Heartaches + Devotion (Theme from Satie) 	
Don't Be Emotional 
You Won't See Me Cry (Theme from Vangelis "I'll Find My Way Home") 	
Te Quiero - Interlude 	
Reprise: ¡Fiesta Fatal! 
¡Fiesta Fatal! (Barcelona Tribe Megamix)

Suave Suave (1995) 
Suave Suave 	
Que Mala Vida 	
Sensual 	
Ahoy 	
Hablando 	
Interlude 	
Albatross 	
Te Siento 
Nanita (A Spanish Lullaby) 	
Poesia (Poem By Antonio Machado)
Yo Quiero Todo 	
Nanita (En Espanol)

Sensual Sensual (1998) 
Overture (Concierto De Aranjuez) 	
Alegria 	
Sometimes 	
Zapateado 	
Tribute To J.S. Bach 	
La Guapa 
Desesperada 	
Sa Trincha 	
Ahoy Ahoy 	
Ultima Cancion 	
La Unica Excusa...

Spiritual Spiritual (2001) 
Intro 	
Adagio In G-Minor 	
La Guitarra 	
Sketches Of St. Antoni (theme from Vangelis "Le Singe Bleu") 	
Las Salinas 	
Spiritual Spiritual 	
Es Vedra 	
Matador De Sa Pena 	
Reprise: Spiritual 	
Sunset In St. Carlos 	
She Moves Through The Fair 
The Sun

B-Tribe 5 (2003) 
Intro
Anika (feat. Luna)
Angelic Voices
Demasiado
Love (feat. Luna)
Misterio / Interlude
Wisdom & Courage (feat. Luna)
Ode to Dolores del Rio
Mi Alma Espanol
Luna Llena (feat. Luna)
¡Libera Me'!

Holophon presents B-Tribe Volume 6 (2008) 

Agua Azul
Suspiro
Lagrimas
Cristoblanco del Corcovado
La alma de la Guitarra
Pachamama
Principessa
Asturias
Monasterio
Sukha
Sin Alegria
Hasta Luego / Goodbye

Singles
"¡Fiesta Fatal!" (1993)
"Nadie Entiende (Nobody Understands)" (1993)
"You Won't See Me Cry" (1993)
"Nanita (Spanish Lullaby)" (1995)
"Que Mala Vida" (1996)

References

External links
Fansite

New-age music groups
Ambient music groups
Techno music groups